The women's 1500 metres competition at the 2022 European Speed Skating Championships was held on 8 January 2022.

Results
The final was started at 16:59.

References

Women's 1500 metres